Sarah Lahbati (born 9 October 1993) is a  Swiss-born Filipino actress and reality star. She gained media attention as a finalist on the 5th season of reality show StarStruck, a Philippine overall talent show broadcast on GMA Network. Lahbati declared StarStruck V's Ultimate Female Survivors after nine weeks of the competition. Together with Steven Silva, they each won P1.5 million cash prize and an exclusive contract with GMA Network, with a minimum guarantee of P3.5 million.

Early life and education
Lahbati was born in Geneva, Switzerland to a Filipina mother and a Moroccan father. She began her studies in Switzerland before moving to the Philippines, where she studied at the Immaculate Conception Academy in Cavite.

Career
Lahbati made her screen debut as Bong Revilla's daughter in Hokus Pokus. After joining and winning the fifth season of hit reality show StarStruck, Lahbati topbilled GMA Network's drama series, Kokak (2011) and Makapiling Kang Muli (2012) along with her real-life partner Richard Gutierrez. She also starred in different GMA shows such as Love Bug Presents: Exchange of Hearts (2011), Little Star, Koreana and Time of My Life. She also performed in GMA Network's variety show Party Pilipinas and Sunday All Stars as a regular artist.

In 2015, Lahbati transferred to the rival network, ABS-CBN, after her contract under GMA Artist Center finished. She officially joined Viva Artists Agency in June 2015. Tagged as Dance Goddess, Lahbati is a regular performer on ABS-CBN's Sunday variety show, ASAP.

Lahbati was cast in the ABS-CBN soap opera, Written in Our Stars, starring Toni Gonzaga, Piolo Pascual, Jolina Magdangal and Sam Milby which started early 2017. In 2017, she was also cast as Valentina, the Goddess of Snakes, in the movie Darna released by Star Cinema and Reality Entertainment.

Lahbati appears in E! Philippines reality show It Takes Gutz To Be a Gutierrez.

Personal life
On March 14, 2020, Lahbati married actor Richard Gutierrez in Taguig. They have two sons together, Zion (born April 29, 2013) and Kai (born March 21, 2018).

Lawsuit
In late 2012, Lahbati used her Twitter account to express her dissatisfaction with her network, GMA and expressed her desire to be released from her contract. On January 10, 2013, GMA Network and GMA Films president, Annette Gozon-Abrogar, counter-sued Lahbati, and on the following day, January 11, 2013, the network filed a formal complaint against Sarah Lahbati for breach of contract. She was facing multiple charges. In a related article published in PEP last 9 January 2013, Felipe Gozon, the head of GMA Network, released a statement indicating he did not guarantee protection that Sarah Lahbati said she was due. A few days later, Lahbati left the Philippines for Switzerland "to study". In August 2013, Lahbati returned to the Philippines to face the charges against her. It was later revealed that Lahbati left for Switzerland to give birth to her son with Richard Gutierrez that May 2013 at the age of 19.

Filmography

Television

Film

Awards and nominations

Notes

References

External links
 

1993 births
Living people
Filipino child actresses
Filipino film actresses
Filipino people of Moroccan descent
Participants in Philippine reality television series
StarStruck (Philippine TV series) winners
GMA Network personalities
ABS-CBN personalities
Viva Artists Agency
Filipino television actresses
Swiss people of Filipino descent
Swiss people of Moroccan descent
Sarah